Rowayton is an affluent coastal village in the city of Norwalk, Connecticut, roughly  from New York City. The community is governed by the Sixth Taxing District of Norwalk and has a number of active local associations, including the Civic Association, the Historical Society, the Rowayton Library, a Gardeners Club, and a Parents Exchange. Rowayton annually plays host to a Shakespearean production at Pinkney Park, produced by Shakespeare on the Sound, and also has an active community of artists, many of whom are associated with the Rowayton Arts Center.

The Rowayton station on the New Haven line of the Metro-North Railroad is located within the community, as is an elementary school, a public beach and the Rowayton Public Library.

Coastline
The Rowayton coastline has been a source of inspiration for centuries. John Frederick Kensett, a famous 19th century landscape painter of the Hudson School, frequently painted this seascape in his later life. This tradition has been carried on in an active local arts scene.

Rowayton is home to a number of beaches, three of which—Roton Point, Bayley Beach, and a coastal enclave of Wee Burn Country Club—share a common history. In the early 20th century, the properties of all three made up the Roton Point Amusement Park. A boat landing attached to Sunset Rock, just to the West of Belle Island, allowed steam boats to bring day-trippers from New York City to the park. A trolley ran from both Darien and Norwalk, arriving at the Park via Highland Avenue and over present-day Langdon Preserve, located across from Farm Creek. At the amusement park, amenities included a bath house, a picnic grove, and rides ranging from the classic carousel to roller coasters with views of the beach.

"Rock Ledge" estate

The former Rock Ledge estate at 33 and 40-42 Highland Avenue was added to the National Register of Historic Places in 1977. In 1910, James A. Farrell, later president of the United States Steel Corporation, built a Tudor revival mansion, which burned down in 1913 and was rebuilt in granite. The estate was later bought by the Remington Rand Corporation, developers of the UNIVAC computer, which merged with Sperry Corporation to form Sperry Rand. Since 1966, the Farrell family stables have been converted to the Rowayton Community Center and the Rowayton Library. In 1964, part of the estate was purchased by the Thomas School for girls, a day and boarding school founded by Mabel Thomas in 1922. The school later merged with other private schools in the area, eventually becoming King Low Heywood Thomas in 1988. The school is now co-educational and located in Stamford, Connecticut. The mansion and attached office building were previously owned by Hewitt Associates. Currently, the main house of the estate is the headquarters of Graham Capital Management, L.P.

Notable people

George Abbott, Broadway and Hollywood producer/director/writer.
Jerome Beatty Jr., author for the Saturday Review, Colliers, and Esquire
David Bergamini, author of Japan's Imperial Conspiracy and Time-Life Books
Richard Bissell, novelist, some of whose works were adapted to be Broadway musicals
Kay Boyle, novelist and short story author, taught at Thomas School on Bluff Avenue
Philip Caputo, author whose best-known work is A Rumor of War (1977)
Brian Cashman, general manager of the New York Yankees
Ward Chamberlin, PBS executive
Leslie Charleson, TV actress
Helen Oakley Dance, writer and record producer
Stanley Dance, writer and record producer, biographer of Duke Ellington
Brian de Regt, US National Team rower and coach
Jimmy Ernst, artist and teacher
Ian Falconer, children's book author, illustrator, and set/costume designer
Jim Flora, commercial illustrator
Meg Foster, actress 
Joseph Franckenstein, diplomat and teacher 
Robert Griffith, producer of Broadway shows. 
Crockett Johnson, cartoonist and creator of children's books (Harold and the Purple Crayon)
John Frederick Kensett, nineteenth-century artist
Ruth Krauss, author of children's books
Emily Levine, humorist
Albert Markov, violinist and composer
Horace McMahon, actor and little league umpire
Betsy Palmer, actress
Gabor Peterdi, artist
Andy Rooney, author, humorist, television commentator
Emily Rooney, TV producer, journalist, and host
Billy Rose, Ziegfeld impresario and theatrical showman, married to Fanny Brice
Stefan Schnabel, Broadway (Plain and Fancy, Three Penny Opera, etc.), movie actor (Counterfit Traitor, Firefox, etc.)and Doctor Jackson on Guiding Light
Fred Schwed, humorist
John Seymour Sharnik, documentary producer and vice president for CBS News
Treat Williams, movie actor, Prince of the City,  Hair, etc.

Gallery

References

External links
Civic Association
Historical Society
Rowayton Library
Rowayton Arts Center
Shakespeare on the Sound
Rowayton School
 Sale of 40 Highland Avenue a.k.a. "Rock Ledge Estate"

Geography of Norwalk, Connecticut
Neighborhoods in Connecticut
Populated coastal places in Connecticut